Buffalo Public Schools serves approximately 34,000 students in Buffalo, New York, the second largest city in the state of New York. It is located in Erie County of western New York and operates nearly 70 facilities.

History
The Buffalo Public School System was started in 1838, 13 years after the completion of the Erie Canal and only 6 years after the 1832 incorporation of the City of Buffalo. Buffalo was the first city in the state of New York to have a free public education system supported by local taxes. Although New York City had a free public education system prior to 1838, NYC obtained additional funding through private donations and sources. Buffalo Public Schools' first Superintendent of Schools, Oliver Gray Steele (1805–1879), was a prominent and successful business man. Originally from Connecticut, Steele relocated to Buffalo in 1827. He held three different terms as Superintendent between 1838 and 1852, during which twelve new elementary facilities were built, bringing the total to 15 elementary buildings. A building for a dedicated high school was also purchased during this time. Steele is credited as being the "Father of the Public Schools of Buffalo" as his reorganization of the schools in Buffalo enabled children to have access to a free public education. Over 35 people have held the position of Superintendent of Buffalo Public Schools since that time.

Administration
The Board of Education of the Buffalo City School District is the policy-making body for the Buffalo Public Schools, as provided by the Constitution of New York, and is under the general supervision of the New York State Education Department.  The board consists of nine members elected by popular vote of District residents.

Schools

Elementary schools
Except where noted, all schools serve Grades PreK-8
 D'Youville Porter Campus School, Front Park 
 Buffalo Elementary School of Technology, Willert Park
 Early Childhood Center 17, Cold Springs
 Dr. Antonia Pantoja Community School of Academic Excellence, Front Park
 Native American Magnet School, Grant Ferry
 Hillery Park Elementary School, Seneca
 Frank A. Sedita Academy, Front Park
 Harriet Ross Tubman School, Emslie
 Bennett Park Montessori School, Willert Park
 Bilingual Center, First Ward
 Marva J. Daniel Futures Preparatory School, Medical Park
 Lovejoy Discovery School, Lovejoy
 International School, Grant Ferry
 School 48 @ MLK, Medical Park
 North Park Community School, North Park
 Community School, Kingsley
 Dr. George E. Blackman School of Excellence, #54, Parkside
 Dr. Charles R. Drew Science Magnet, MLK Park
 Annex 59, Polonia
 Arthur O. Eve School of Distinction, Leroy
 Frederick Law Olmsted School, Park Meadow
 Roosevelt Early Childhood Center, Riverside
 Discovery School, South Abbott
 Houghton Academy, Kaisertown
 Lorraine Elementary School, Abbott McKinley
 Hamlin Park Claude & Ouida Clapp Academy, Hamlin Park
 Herman Badillo Bilingual Academy, Columbus
 William J. Grabiarz School of Excellence, Military
 Highgate Heights School, Kensington
 School 81, North Park
 Early Childhood Center 82, Kenfield
 Health Care Center for Children, Grider
 Dr. Lydia T. Wright School of Excellence, Grider
 B.U.I.L.D. Community School, MLK Park
 Southside Elementary School, Seneca
 West Hertel Academy, Military
 Waterfront Elementary School, Columbus
 Harvey Austin School, Emerson
 Stanley Makowski Early Childhood Center, Kingsley

Secondary schools
Except where noted, all schools serve Grades 9-12

Defunct schools

References

External links

New York State Education Department
Buffalo City Schools New York State Report Card 2007

1838 establishments in New York (state)
Education in Buffalo, New York
School districts established in 1838
School districts in New York (state)